Jeevana Tharanga is a 1963 Indian Kannada-language film, directed by G. Bangar Raj and produced by D. Rama Naidu. The film stars Rajkumar, Rajashankar, D. R. Naidu and K. S. Ashwath. The film has musical score by M. Venkataraju.

Cast

Rajkumar as Kumar
Raja Shankar
D. R. Naidu
K. S. Ashwath
Dikki Madhava Rao
Balakrishna
Subbanna
Narasimharaju
B. Hanumanthachar
Leelavathi
Advani Lakshmi Devi
M. Jayashree
Ramadevi
Jr Revathi
Leela Jayavanthi
Chandrakala (credited as Kumari Chandrakala)
Chithradevi
Rajani

Soundtrack

References

External links
 

1963 films
1960s Kannada-language films
Films scored by M. Venkataraju